Lady Hyegyeong of the Pungsan Hong clan (혜경궁 풍산 홍씨, 惠慶宮 豊山 洪氏; 6 August 1735 – 13 January 1816), also known as Queen Heongyeong (헌경왕후, 獻敬王后), was a Korean writer and Crown Princess during the Joseon Dynasty. She was the wife of Crown Prince Sado and mother of King Jeongjo. In 1903, Emperor Gojong gave her the posthumous name of Heongyeong, the Virtuous Empress (헌경의황후, 獻敬懿皇后).

Early life
Lady Hong was born in 1735, the third child and second daughter of the scholar Hong Bong-han of the Pungsan Hong clan and his first wife, Lady Yi of the Hansan Yi clan. Lady Hong was the great-great-great granddaughter of Princess Jeongmyeong, a daughter of Seonjo of Joseon and Queen Inmok. One of her father’s younger half-sisters eventually married Jo Eom (조엄, 趙曮) (1719 - 1777) of the Pungyang Jo clan, and became the great-grandmother to Queen Shinjeong, wife of Crown Prince Hyomyeong and mother of King Heonjong. Thus making Lady Hong be a first cousin twice removed of the future Queen. 

In her memoirs, Lady Hyegyeong recalls being very attached to her parents, sleeping in her parents' room and accompanying her mother during her confinement for the birth of her brother, Hong Nak-sin. Lady Hyegyeong's parent's marriage suffered strain after the death of her paternal grandfather, but the couple reconciled when the young child refused to eat. She was taught to read and write vernacular Korean by an aunt-in-law, Lady Shin of the Pyeongsan Shin clan.

Selection as Crown Princess
In 1744, a royal edict was sent out requesting that families with eligible girls submit their names for the selection of a spouse for the son of King Yeongjo, the Crown Prince Sado. Lady Yi was unwilling to submit her nine-year-old daughter for consideration, but her husband insisted. For the first selection process, the Hong family was not particularly wealthy, so Lady Yi stitched outfits suitable for presentation at court from old clothes. Lady Hong thought that she would be too young to be successful, but she was summoned to a private audience with the crown prince's mother and eldest sister. During the second presentation, three girls were selected, but Lady Hong writes in her memoir that King Yeongjo complimented her as a "beautiful daughter-in-law," during their meeting.

The nine-year-old Lady Hong moved into a pavilion outside the palace, where she was tutored for a month by her parents and palace staff. The wedding ceremony with nine-year-old Crown Prince Sado was held over a period of seven days in the first month of 1744.

Palace life
Lady Hyegyeong's family initially enjoyed a close relationship with their royal in-laws and her father was employed in various official roles during his lifetime. Hong Bong-han even tutored Crown Prince Sado early in his daughter's marriage. Lady Hyegyeong recalls that, as early as 1745, Prince Sado was displaying strange behaviours, at several points losing consciousness. The marriage was consummated in the same month as the 14-year-old Prince Sado's capping ceremony in 1749.

Lady Hyegyeong gave birth to a son in 1750, but he died in 1752. Later the same year, she had another son named Yi San. The birth of a male heir so soon after the death of her eldest son meant that the court was particularly happy to welcome Yi San. The crown Princess later gave birth to her first daughter, Princess Cheongyeon in 1754, and another daughter, Princess Cheongseon, in 1756.

Crown Prince Sado's illness
During their marriage, Prince Sado's showed signs of increasingly severe mental illnesses. The symptoms included a sudden terror of thunder, inability to speak before his father, and a wish for death. After an argument with his father in 1756, Sado berated an official and, in his haste to pursue him, knocked over a candlestick that started a fire, burning down several buildings. Lady Hyegyeong, who was five months pregnant with Princess Cheongseon, ran to collect her son. When King Yeongjo discovered in 1757 that Prince Sado had fathered a daughter, Princess Cheonggeun, with a secondary consort, Court Lady Park, he criticised Lady Hyegyeong severely for helping Sado hide this. Afterwards, Lady Hyegyeong disguised the woman and snuck her out of the palace, hiding her at the home of Princess Hwawan.

Lady Hyegyeong attempted to support her husband in his illness. Her role in his life included procuring sufficient cloth to make multiple sets of clothes, as the prince's, "clothing phobia," that arose in 1757 caused him to often burn outfits before selecting one to wear. In the sixth month, Prince Sado entered their pavilion holding the severed head of a eunuch, which he forced the ladies-in-waiting to view. Later, he became violent towards the ladies-in-waiting, causing Lady Hyegyeong to report to his mother, Royal Noble Consort Yeong, that his illness was worsening. Royal Noble Consort Yeong wanted to speak to Prince Sado, but was persuaded not to, as Lady Hyegyeong said she feared for her own safety if he found out that his wife had spoken to others about it. In her memoirs, Lady Hyegyeong describes fearing for the safety of herself and her children when Prince Sado was having manic episodes. In 1760, she recalls Prince Sado threw a go board at her, which hit her in the face and caused such a large bruise around her eye that she had to miss a ceremony for King Yeongjo's moving house.

In 1762, Prince Sado summoned his wife. Convinced she was going to die, Lady Hyegyeong first visited her son Yi San. On arriving, Prince Sado requested that she bring him their son's cap to wear to meet his father, but Lady Hyegyeong presented him with his own cap. When he left, Lady Hyegyeong returned to her son, where she later heard a eunuch requesting a rice chest from the kitchens. At this, Yi San ran outside to beg for his father's life and Lady Hyegyeong attempted suicide with scissors, but was stopped. She then went to the wall next to the courtyard where Sado was being sentenced by King Yeongjo and listened to her husband beg for his life. She then listened to the sound of Sado trying to get out of the chest.

Lady Hyegyeong wrote a letter begging clemency of King Yeongjo for herself and Yi San. The same day, her elder brother arrived with an edict to escort her to her father's home. Lady Hyegyeong was carried to a palanquin, where she fainted. Yi San later joined his mother at his grandfather’s Hong Bong-han's house, along with his consort and younger sisters. Eight days later, Prince Sado was pronounced dead and Lady Hyegyeong returned to the palace for the mourning rituals.

Aftermath
She wrote The Memoirs of Lady Hyegyeong, detailing her life as the ill-fated Crown Princess, her husband's descent into madness and the deeds for which he was eventually put to death.

Titles 

 6 August 1735 - January 1744: Lady Hong, daughter of Hong Bong-han of the Pungsan Hong clan
 January 1744 - 12 July 1762: Her Highness, The Crown Princess of Joseon (왕세자빈; 王世子嬪)
 12 July 1762 - 17 April 1776: Her Highness, The Crown Princess Dowager of Joseon (왕세자대빈; 王世 子大嬪)
 Crown Princess Consort Hye (혜빈, 惠嬪)
 17 April 1776 - 13 January 1816: Lady Hyegyeong (혜경궁, 惠慶宮)
 Posthumous title: Queen Heongyeong (헌경왕후; 興慶王后)

Family
 Great-Great-Great-Great-Great-Grandfather
 Hong Yi-sang (홍이상, 洪履祥) (1549 - 1615)
 Great-Great-Great-Great-Great-Grandmother
 Lady Kim of the Andong Kim clan (정경부인 안동 김씨, 贈 貞敬夫人 安東 金氏) (1554 - 1616)
 Great-Great-Great-Great-Grandfather
 Hong Yeong (홍영, 洪霙) (1584 - 1645)
 Great-Great-Great-Great-Grandmother
 Lady Yi of the Yeonan Yi clan (정경부인 연안 이씨, 貞敬夫人 延安 李氏) (? - 1656)
 Great-Great-Great-Grandfather
 Hong Ju-won ( 홍주원, 洪柱元) (1606 - 1672)
 Great-Great-Great-Grandmother
 Princess Jeongmyeong (정명공주, 貞明公主) (1603 - 1685); King Seonjo's and Queen Inmok’s only daughter
 Great-Great-Grandfather
 Hong Man-yong (홍만용, 洪萬容) (1631 - 1692)
 Great-Great-Grandmother
 Lady Song of the Yeosan Song clan (본관: 여산 송씨, 礪山 宋氏) (1629 - 1677)
 Great-Grandfather
 Hong Joong-ki (홍중기, 洪重箕) (1650 - 1706)
 Great-Grandmother
 Lady Yi of the Jeonju Yi clan (본관: 전주 이씨, 全州 李氏); (이민서의 딸) daughter of Yi Min-seo (이민서, 李敏敍) (1633 - 1688)
 Grandfather
 Hong Hyeon-bo (1680 - 1740) (홍현보)
 Grandmother
 Lady Im of the Pungcheon Im clan (본관: 풍천 임씨); Hong Hyeon-bo's first wife, daughter of Im Bang (임방, 任埅) (1640 - 1724)
 Step-grandmother - Lady Yi of the Seongju Yi clan (성주 이씨)
 Father
 Hong Bong-han (1713 - 1778) (홍봉한, 洪鳳漢)
 Half-aunt - Lady Hong of the Pungsan Hong clan (풍산홍씨, 豊山 洪氏) (1717 - 1808)
 Half-uncle - Jo Eom (조엄, 趙曮) (1719 - 1777)
 Uncle - Hong In-han (홍인한, 洪麟漢) (1722 - 5 July 1776)
 Aunt - Internal Princess Consort Pyeongsan of the Pyeongsan Shin clan (평산부부인 신씨)
 Cousin - Hong Nak-won (홍낙원, 洪樂源)
 Cousin - Hong Nak-sul (홍낙술, 洪樂述)
 Cousin - Hong Nak-jin (홍낙진, 洪樂進)
 Cousin - Hong Nak-sun (홍낙손, 洪樂遜)
 Cousin - Hong Nak-joon (홍낙준, 洪樂浚)
 Cousin - Lady Hong of the Pungsan Hong clan (풍산 홍씨)
 Cousin-in-law - Sim Neung-pil (심능필, 沈能弼)
 Uncle - Hong Jun-han (홍준한, 洪俊漢) (1731 - ?)
 Uncle - Hong Yong-han (홍용한, 洪龍漢) (1734 - 1809)
 Mother 
 Internal Princess Consort Hansan of the Hansan Yi clan (1713 - 1755) (한산부부인 한산 이씨, 韓山府夫人 韓山 李氏)
 Maternal Grandfather: Yi Jib (1670 - 1727) (이집, 李潗)
 Maternal Grandmother: Lady Yu of the Gigye Yu clan (본관: 기계 유씨, 杞溪 兪氏)
 Stepmother - Lady Kim of the Gimhae Kim clan (정부인 김해 김씨, 貞夫人 金海 金氏)
 Siblings
 Older brother: Hong Nak-in (홍낙인, 洪樂仁) (1729 - 19 June 1777)
 Sister-in-law: Lady Min of the Yeoheung Min clan (본관: 여흥 민씨, 驪興 閔氏)
 Nephew: Hong Soo-yeong (홍수영, 洪守榮)
 Older sister: Lady Hong of the Pungsan Hong clan (본관: 풍산 홍씨, 豊山 洪氏); died young
 Younger brother: Hong Nak-sin (홍낙신, 洪樂信) (1739 - 1796)
 Sister-in-law: Lady Jo of the Imcheon Jo clan (본관: 임천 조씨, 林川 趙氏); (조명건의 딸) daughter of Jo Myeong-geon
 Younger brother: Hong Nak-im (홍낙임, 洪樂任) (1741 - 1801)
 sister-in-law: Lady Jo of the Imcheon Jo clan (본관: 임천 조씨, 林川 趙氏); (조명건의 딸) daughter of Jo Myeong-geon
 Younger sister: Lady Hong of the Pungsan Hong clan (본관: 풍산 홍씨, 豊山 洪氏)
 Brother-in-law: Yi Bok-il of the Jeonju Yi clan (이복일, 李復一) (1746 - ?)
 Younger brother: Hong Nak-ryun (홍낙륜, 洪樂倫) (November 1750 - 1813)
 Sister-in-law: Lady Kim of the Cheongpung Kim clan (본관: 청풍 김씨, 淸風 金氏)
 Sister-in-law: Lady Yi of the Deoksu Yi clan (본관: 덕수 이씨, 德水 李氏)
 Younger half-brother: Hong Nak-jwa (홍낙좌)
 Sister-in-law: Lady Shin of the Pyeongsan Shin clan (평산 신씨, 平山 申氏)
 Younger half-brother: Hong Nak-woo (홍낙우)
 Younger half-brother: Hong Nak-dong (홍낙동)
 Younger half-brother: Hong Nak-yi (홍낙이)
 Sister-in-law: Lady Kim of the Andong Kim clan (안동 김씨, 安東 金氏)
 Husband
 Yi Seon, Crown Prince Sado (13 February 1735 – 12 July 1762) (이선 사도세자)
 Father-in-law: Yi Geum, King Yeongjo of Joseon (31 October 1694 – 22 April 1776) (조선 영조)
 Mother-in-law: Royal Noble Consort Yeongbin Yi (15 August 1696 – 23 August 1764) (영빈 이씨)
 Legal mother-in-law: Queen Jeongseong of the Daegu Seo clan (12 January 1693 – 3 April 1757) (정성왕후 서씨)
 Legal mother-in-law: Queen Jeongsun of the Gyeongju Kim clan (2 December 1745 – 11 February 1805) (정순왕후 김씨)
 Issue 
 Yi Jeong, Crown Prince Uiso (27 September 1750 - 17 April 1752) (이정 의소세자)
 Yi San, King Jeongjo of Joseon (28 October 1752 – 18 August 1800) (조선 정조)
 Daughter-in-law: Queen Hyoui of the Cheongpung Kim clan (5 January 1754 - 10 April 1821) (효의왕후 김씨)
 Princess Cheongyeon (1754 - 9 June 1821) (청연공주)
 Son-in-law: Kim Gi-seong (1752 - 1811) (김기성, 金箕性)
 Grandson: Kim Jae-chang (김재창, 金在昌) (1770 - 1849)
 Granddaughter: Lady Kim of the Gwangsan Kim clan (본관: 광산 김씨, 光山 金氏) (1771 - 1787); married Jo Jae-gyu (조재규, 趙在奎) of the Imcheon Jo clan (임천 조씨) (1772 - 1843)
 Grandson: Kim Jae-sam (김재삼, 金在三) (1776 -1837)
 Unnamed grandson; died prematurely 
 Unnamed grandson; died prematurely 
 Unnamed grandson; died prematurely 
 Unnamed grandson; died prematurely 
 Unnamed grandson; died prematurely 
 Granddaughter: Lady Kim of the Gwangsan Kim clan (본관: 광산 김씨, 光山 金氏); died prematurely 
 Princess Cheongseon (1756 - 20 July 1802) (청선공주)
 Son-in-law: Jeong Jae-hwa (1754 - 1790) (정재화, 鄭在和)
 Grandson: Jeong Ui (정의, 鄭漪) (1782 - 1832)
 Granddaughter: Lady Jeong of the Yeonil Jeong clan (본관: 연일 정씨, 延日 鄭氏); married Min Chi-seong (민치성, 閔致成) of the Yeoheung Min clan
 Granddaughter: Lady Jeong of the Yeonil Jeong clan (본관: 연일 정씨, 延日 鄭氏); married Hong Hyeok (홍혁, 洪赫) of the Pungsan Hong clan

In popular culture

Film and television
 Portrayed by Choi Myung-gil in the 1988 MBC TV series The Memoirs of Lady Hyegyeong.
 Portrayed by Ha Hee-ra in the 1998 KBS TV series Heaven Heaven.
 Portrayed by Kyeon Mi-ri in the 2007 MBC TV series Lee San, Wind of the Palace.
 Portrayed by Jung Ae-ri in the 2007 CGV TV series Eight Days, Assassination Attempts against King Jeongjo.
 Portrayed by Kim Sung-ryung in the 2014 film The Fatal Encounter.
 Portrayed by Park Eun-bin in the 2014 SBS TV series Secret Door.
 Portrayed by Moon Geun-young in the 2015 film The Throne.
 Portrayed by Kang Mal-geum in 2021 TV series The Red Sleeve.

Literature
The novel The Red Queen by Margaret Drabble is based on the story of Lady Hyegyeong.

References

Notes

Works cited

19th-century Korean people
1735 births
1816 deaths
18th-century Korean women writers
18th-century Korean writers
People from Seoul
18th-century memoirists